Kumar Shri Indrajitsinhji Madhavsinhji (15 June 1937 – 12 March 2011) was an Indian cricketer who played in four Test matches from 1964 to 1969 as a wicketkeeper-batsman.

Early life 
Indrajitsinhji was born in Jamnagar, Gujarat. He was educated at the Rajkumar College and St. Stephen's College.

Career 
He played first-class cricket from 1954 to 1973, for Delhi and Saurashtra. He was one of the first wicketkeepers to pass 100 dismissals (caught or stumped) in the Ranji Trophy, and set a record by taking 23 dismissals in the competition in one year in the 1960–61 season.

Although an accomplished wicketkeeper in Indian domestic cricket, he was kept out of the India national cricket team by Farokh Engineer and Budhi Kunderan. He played in only four Test matches: the three-match series against Australia in 1964–65, and one Test against New Zealand at Hyderabad in 1969–70 when Engineer was injured.

He died in Mumbai at the age of 73.

Personal life and family 
His grandfather, Mohansinhji, was the brother of Ranjitsinhji and uncle of Duleepsinhji, both of whom also played Test cricket. His cousins included Suryaveer Singh and Hanumant Singh. He was educated at Rajkumar College, Rajkot.

Family tree

External links

 Former wicketkeeper KS Indrajitsinhji dies, Cricinfo, 16 March 2011
 Indrajitsinhji: A blue-blooded cricketer who was born at the wrong time

References 

1937 births
2011 deaths
India Test cricketers
Indian cricketers
People from Jamnagar
Cricketers from Gujarat
Saurashtra cricketers
Delhi cricketers
North Zone cricketers
West Zone cricketers
Indian Universities cricketers
Associated Cement Company cricketers
L. C. Stevens' XI cricketers
Wicket-keepers